Elminster in Hell is a fantasy novel by the Canadian writer Ed Greenwood, set in the Forgotten Realms, the setting for the Dungeons & Dragons role-playing game created by himself.

The novel is structured as an epistolary novel but instead of letters there are the memories that Nergal to delete Elminster, interspersed by short mental dialogues between the two shows where the ironic and provocative personality of the Old Wizard, which often allows, in a veiled way or less, to make fun of the arch-fiend, knowing full well that the result is more pain.

Plot
Elminster attempts to close a planar rift which connects Toril to Avernus of the Nine Hells, to prevent devils from invading, but he is captured and tortured by the outcast archdevil Nergal until Mystra sends her most powerful agents to rescue him.

Reception

Reviews
Review by Don Bassingthwaite (2002) in Black Gate, Winter 2002

References

 

2001 novels
Forgotten Realms novels